Sun Qingyun (born October 1954) is a former Chinese politician who spent most of his career in northwest China's Shaanxi province. He has been stripped of his post in November 2015. Through his career he has served as vice-chairman of Shaanxi Provincial Committee of the Chinese People's Political Consultative Conference, the Deputy Communist Party Secretary of Shaanxi, and the Party Secretary of Xi'an.

Biography
Sun was born in Ling County, Shandong, in October 1954. At the age of 15, he joined the People's Liberation Army. After military service, he worked in China Youth Daily as an editor and journalist. He entered politics in December 1969, and joined the Chinese Communist Party in November 1971. Then he worked in General Office of the CCP Heilongjiang Provincial Committee and CCP Shandong Provincial Committee respectively.

He was a secretary in the General Office of the State Council of the People's Republic of China between October 1994 to December 1998. Than he was transferred to Xi'an, capital of northwest China's Shaanxi province, by age 44. He served as vice-mayor of Xi'an in December 1998, and held that office until October 2000, when he was promoted to become deputy party boss. He was deputy party boss, mayor and secretary of the party leadership group of Xi'an from January 2002 to July 2006. In July 2006 he was promoted again to become party boss, the top political position in the city and at vice-ministerial level, he held that position until June 2012. He rose to become deputy party boss of Shaanxi in May 2012, and concurrently served as vice-chairman of Shaanxi Provincial Committee of the Chinese People's Political Consultative Conference in January 2015.

Sun was a delegate to the 17th and 18th National Congress of the Chinese Communist Party and a delegate to the 10th and 12th National People's Congress.

Downfall
At the beginning of September, 2015, Sun was taken away when his plane landed in Beijing for a conference. In November he was removed from his post by the CCP Shaanxi Provincial Committee and was placed on two-year probation within the Party, having held the consultative position for only nine months; he was demoted to a chuji "non-leading position". Three Shaanxi businessmen, President of Xi'an Aibo Group Zhao Jingbo (He is also Sun's relative), President of Shaanxi Horeal Group Co., Ltd. Wang Shichun and President of Shaanxi Jinshida Real Estate Co., Ltd Bai Haining, who had close relations with Sun Qingyun, were detained by the Communist Party's anti-corruption agency.

References

External links

1954 births
People from Dezhou
Living people
Harbin Normal University alumni
People's Republic of China politicians from Shandong
Chinese Communist Party politicians from Shandong
Delegates to the 10th National People's Congress
Delegates to the 12th National People's Congress
Communist Party secretaries of Xi'an
Deputy Communist Party secretaries of Shaanxi